Marcelo Aguirre may refer to:

 Marcelo Aguirre (footballer) (born 1983), Argentine football midfielder
 Marcelo Aguirre (table tennis) (born 1993), Paraguay table tennis player